Llanilar is a village and community in Ceredigion, Wales, about  southeast of Aberystwyth. It is the eponym of the hundred of Ilar. The population at the 2011 census was 1,085. The community includes Rhos-y-garth.

Name
In Welsh placenames, many smaller communities are named for their parish (llan), having grown up around the local church. This town's name honours its patron saint, although it is disputed whether that is the church's presumed founder Ilar (Welsh for "Hilary"), listed as a member of Cadfan's mission and a martyr but now almost totally forgotten, or the more famous Hilary who was bishop of Poitiers in France and is still celebrated by the Anglican and Catholic churches in Wales. (The confusion is not helped by Edward Williams's numerous forgeries which he included in the Iolo Manuscripts.)

History and amenities 
There is a Roman site just to the east. The present village was built along the southern side of the scenic River Ystwyth and contains a parish church, Nonconformist chapel, primary school, GP Surgery, and garage. The village post office is now closed but a mobile van visits several times during the week.

St Hilary's Church has a large square tower, chancel, nave, and porch. In the porch is a hollowed stone for holding holy water and, above the door, there is an ancient beam with carved heads and animals inscribed with the words J.S. W.W.A. Church Wardens, 1683.  Under the name "Church of St Ilar", it is a grade II* listed building.

Llanilar railway station on the line from Carmarthen to Aberystwyth opened in 1867 and closed in 1964 following severe flooding in the Llanilar area.

Notable people
Saint Ilar (6th C. AD), a putative Breton missionary and martyr
 John Jones (1700–1770), clergyman and controversialist
 Evan Lewis (1818–1901), clergyman, Dean of Bangor Cathedral from 1884
Dai Jones MBE (1943–2022), a Welsh broadcaster who lived and farmed in Llanilar

References

External links
www.geograph.co.uk : photos of Llanilar and surrounding area
: Llanilar Health Centre

Villages in Ceredigion